Why Women Remarry is a 1923 American silent crime drama film directed by John Gorman and starring Milton Sills,  Ethel Grey Terry and William Lowery.

Synopsis
Martin Talbot, a heavy gambler who mistreats his family is murdered. The man who is blamed for it is in fact innocent, as a policeman is able to establish. However, all the wives connected with the case remarry to start new lives.

Cast
 Milton Sills as 	Dan Hannon
 Ethel Grey Terry as Mary Talbot
 William Lowery as 	Martin Tablot
 Marion Feducha as 	Jimmy Talbot
 Jeanne Carpenter as 	Mildred Talbot
 Wilfred Lucas as 	Mr. Compton
 Clarissa Selwynne as 	Mrs. Compton
 James Barton as 	Don Compton
 Anita Simons as 	Mrs. McKinnon
 George 'Gabby' Hayes as Tuck McKinnon 
 Tom McGuire as Robert Milton 
 Bud Geary as 	Billy 
 Carol Holloway as 	Dan Hannon's sister
 Westcott Clarke as 	Dan Hannon's sister's first husband
 Robert Walker as 	Dan Hannon's sister's second husband

References

Bibliography
 Connelly, Robert B. The Silents: Silent Feature Films, 1910-36, Volume 40, Issue 2. December Press, 1998.
 Munden, Kenneth White. The American Film Institute Catalog of Motion Pictures Produced in the United States, Part 1. University of California Press, 1997.

External links
 

1923 films
1923 drama films
1920s English-language films
American silent feature films
Silent American drama films
American black-and-white films
Films directed by John Gorman
1920s American films